Gregorio Evelio Hernández López (December 24, 1930 – December 18, 2015) was a Cuban right-handed pitcher who appeared in 18 games for the – Washington Senators of Major League Baseball.

Hernández' professional career on the North American mainland spanned 11 seasons (1954–1958; 1961–1964; 1966–1967) and 370 games in United States and Mexican  league baseball.  His notable seasons included 1955, when he won 23 games and lost 15 while pitching in 55 games and 271 innings for the Hobbs Sports of the Class C Longhorn League, and the following year, 1956, when he won 18 and lost 4, compiling a stellar 2.86 earned run average, for the Charlotte Hornets of the Class A Sally League. That performance earned him a late-season call-up to the Senators, when he appeared in four games.

Hernández split the next season between Charlotte, the Double-A Chattanooga Lookouts, and the Senators, for whom he worked in 14 more games. Altogether, his Major League record included one complete game, a 1–1 won-lost record (with an ERA of 4.45), 28 bases on balls and 24 strikeouts in 58⅔ innings.

References

External links

1930 births
2015 deaths
Charlotte Hornets (baseball) players
Chattanooga Lookouts players
Hobbs Sports players
Jacksonville Suns players
Major League Baseball pitchers
Major League Baseball players from Cuba
Cuban expatriate baseball players in the United States
Rock Hill Chiefs players
Roswell Rockets players
Sultanes de Monterrey players
Washington Senators (1901–1960) players
Baseball players from Havana